South Korea competed at the 2020 Winter Youth Olympics in Lausanne, Switzerland from 9 to 22 January 2020.

It competes in 13 sports and has 40 competitors. On the final day, the country brings home 8 medals (5 golds and 3 silver).

As Gangwon is the host city of the next winter youth games, a Korean segment was revealed during the closing ceremony.

Medalists
Medals awarded to participants of mixed-NOC teams are represented in italics. These medals are not counted towards the individual NOC medal tally.

Alpine skiing

Boys

Girls

Biathlon

Boys

Girls

Mixed

Bobsleigh

Cross-country skiing 

Boys

Girls

Curling

South Korea qualified a mixed team of four athletes.
Mixed team

Mixed doubles

Figure skating

One figure skaters achieved quota places for South Korea based on the results of the 2019 World Junior Figure Skating Championships.

Singles

Mixed NOC team trophy

Freestyle skiing 

Slopestyle & Big Air

Ice hockey

Boys
Hong Seung-woo
Kim San-gyeob
Sohn Hyun

Girls
Kang Si-hyun
Lee Eun-ji
Shin Seo-yoon
Yoo Seo-young

Short track speed skating

Four skaters achieved quota places for South Korea based on the results of the 2019 World Junior Short Track Speed Skating Championships.

Boys

Girls

Skeleton

Ski mountaineering

Boys

Girls

Sprint

Snowboarding

Snowboard cross

Halfpipe, Slopestyle, & Big Air

Speed skating

Three skaters achieved quota places for South Korea based on the results of the 2019 World Junior Speed Skating Championships.

Boys

Girls

Mass Start

Mixed

See also
South Korea at the 2020 Summer Olympics

References

2020 in South Korean sport
Nations at the 2020 Winter Youth Olympics
South Korea at the Youth Olympics